Netball New South Wales is the governing body for netball in New South Wales. It is affiliated to Netball Australia. It is responsible for organizing and managing two elite level teams, New South Wales Swifts and Giants Netball, who compete in Suncorp Super Netball. It is also responsible for organizing and managing the Netball NSW Premier League as well as numerous other leagues and competitions for junior and youth teams. Its headquarters are based at Netball Central, Sydney Olympic Park.

History
Netball New South Wales was formed in 1929 and was originally known as the New South Wales Women's Basketball Association (NSWWBA). It was formed by members of the Sydney City Girls' Amateur Sports Association. In 1970 it became the New South Wales Netball Association (NSWNA).

Between 1980 and 2014, the Netball NSW headquarters were based at the Anne Clark Centre in Lidcombe. It was officially opened on 11 October 1980 and named after Anne Clark, who had served as the organisation's president between 1950 and 1979. In December 2014, Netball NSW moved to its current home at Netball Central, Sydney Olympic Park.

Representative teams

Current

Former

Competitions
 Netball NSW Premier League 
 Dooleys Metro League 
 Regional League
 Regional State Cup
 Senior State Titles 
 Junior State Titles 
 Summer Series
 Masters State Titles
 Social Masters

Netball NSW Board 
Notable board members

References

External links
   Netball NSW on Facebook
   Netball NSW on Twitter
 Netball NSW on Instagram

 
New South Wales
Netball
1929 establishments in Australia